DeMarcus Family Rules is a 2020 reality television show streaming television series starring Allison DeMarcus and Jay DeMarcus.

Cast 
 Allison DeMarcus
 Jay DeMarcus

Episodes

Release 
DeMarcus Family Rules was released on August 19, 2020, on Netflix.

References

External links
 
 

2020s American reality television series
2020 American television series debuts
2020 American television series endings
English-language Netflix original programming
Television series by All3Media